The  microprocessor complex subunit DGCR8  (DiGeorge syndrome critical region 8) is a protein that in humans is encoded by the  gene. In other animals, particularly the common model organisms Drosophila melanogaster and Caenorhabditis elegans, the protein is known as Pasha (partner of Drosha). It is a required component of the RNA interference pathway.

Function 

The subunit DGCR8 is localized to the cell nucleus and is required for microRNA (miRNA) processing. It binds to the other subunit Drosha, an RNase III enzyme, to form the microprocessor complex that cleaves a primary transcript known as pri-miRNA to a characteristic stem-loop structure known as a pre-miRNA, which is then further processed to miRNA fragments by the enzyme Dicer. DGCR8 contains an RNA-binding domain and is thought to bind pri-miRNA to stabilize it for processing by Drosha.

DGCR8 is also required for some types of DNA repair. Removal of UV-induced DNA photoproducts, during transcription coupled nucleotide excision repair (TC-NER), depends on JNK phosphorylation of DGCR8 on serine 153. While DGCR8 is known to function in microRNA biogenesis, this activity is not required for DGCR8-dependent removal of UV-induced photoproducts.

References

Further reading 

 
 
 
 
 
 
 
 

MicroRNA
RNA interference
DNA repair